La reina del trópico (The Queen of the Tropics) is a Mexican drama film directed by Raúl de Anda. It was released in 1946 and starring María Antonieta Pons and Luis Aguilar.

Plot
In Papantla, Veracruz, the orphan girl Maria Antonia (María Antonieta Pons) lives with Don Anselmo (Arturo Soto Rangel), a peasant producer of vanilla and his wife Trini (Maria Gentil Arcos), who adopted her since she was very small. Arrives from  the Mexico City the lawyer Esteban (Carlos López Moctezuma), son of Don Anselmo, and in the feast of the Corpus he dazzles with the beauty of María Antonia. the villain intoxicates the girl with the purpose to possess her. He returns to Mexico City and he promises to María Antonia that he come back for her when he has triumphed. Don Anselmo seriously ill and María Antonia travels to Mexico City to tell Esteban, who does not want to receive in his luxury apartment. Maria Antonia is alone and to the mercy of the dangers of the city, until she meets the young Andres (Luis Aguilar) and his friend Pizarrín (Fernando Soto "Mantequilla"), who give her asylum in their neighborhood.

Cast
 María Antonieta Pons ... María Antonia
 Luis Aguilar ... Andrés
 Carlos López Moctezuma ... Esteban
 Fernando Soto "Mantequilla" ... Pizarrín
 Arturo Soto Rangel ... Don Anselmo
 María Gentil Arcos ... Doña Trini
 Emma Roldán ...  Doña Gumersinda

Reviews
When one says that Maria Antonieta Pons is the Queen of the Tropics, it is true, because it is the name of a movie that she starred surrounded by great actors. To justify her Cuban accent, in the film was assigned to her a role of an orphan whose origin was unknown and was adopted by a peasant couple; the plot happening in Papantla, Veracruz. Even when she tried to be demure, she don't kept to hearing the call of the music, and to the minimum provocation, she moves with the rhythm of the music in the company of another Cuban dancer highlighted in the Mexican cinema: Kiko Mendive, who prepared several choreographies executed by this rumbera star.

References

External links
 
 Películas Pepito: La reina del trópico (1946)

1946 films
Mexican black-and-white films
Rumberas films
1940s Spanish-language films
Mexican drama films
1946 drama films
1940s Mexican films